Hayden John Parker (born 19 November 1990) is a New Zealand rugby union player who currently plays as a first five-eighth for the Japanese based HITO-Communications Sunwolves in Super Rugby and  in New Zealand's domestic Mitre 10 Cup.

Early career

Born in Oamaru, the largest town in the district of North Otago on New Zealand's South Island, Parker was raised on his family's dairy and beef farm in the small community of Kurow 60 km to the north-west of his birthplace.   He later headed south to Dunedin to attend the prestigious Otago Boys' High School and played first XV rugby for them.   After graduating from high school, he began playing for the Taieri Eels in Dunedin's Premier club rugby competition.

Senior career

Parker first played provincial rugby at the age of 19, debuting in a match against  on 26 August 2010. The season was a miserable one for Otago, who finished 14th and last, consigning themselves to a place in the newly formed Championship division for 2011, while the match against Taranaki was to be Parker's sole appearance for the season. He played 6 times the following year to help Otago to 3rd place on the Championship log, which saw them miss out on a playoff place only due to the shortened domestic season needed to accommodate the 2011 Rugby World Cup, but by 2012, he had become his province's first choice in the number 10 shirt.

Parker continued to be a regular in Otago's starting XV through 2013 and 2014, playing 21 times across the 2 years as his side finished 2nd and 6th respectively on the log.   He sat out the 2015 ITM Cup after undergoing surgery on a long-standing shoulder injury, however at the tournament's conclusion, back to full fitness, he headed to Japan to take up a short-term contract with Top League side the Panasonic Wild Knights.   Originally a back-up to experienced Australian number 10, Berrick Barnes, Parker took over the reins following Barnes' injury and kept his place in the side as the Wild Knights defeated the Toshiba Brave Lupus in the final to lift their 3rd Top League title in as many years.

Super Rugby

Facing tough competition from future All Black Lima Sopoaga to be back up to the experienced Colin Slade, Parker acquitted himself well, playing 10 times, including 3 starts as well as kicking 29 points as the Highlanders finished a disappointing 14th out 15 teams.

Slade departed for the  ahead of the 2014 Super Rugby season, but Parker once again found himself playing back up, this time to Sopoaga.

Unfortunately for Parker, a shoulder injury which required surgery, limited him to just a solitary appearance and he had to watch from the sidelines as his teammates celebrated their great success.

A knee injury ruled him out of the latter half of the Super Rugby season and the whole of New Zealand's 2016 domestic season, however, despite this, new Highlanders head-coach, Tony Brown who had worked with Parker at domestic level, retained him in the squad for his first year in charge.

International

Parker was a member of the New Zealand Under-20 side which won the 2010 IRB Junior World Championship in Argentina, scoring 25 points in 5 games which included 2 conversions in the 62-17 victory over Australia in the final.

Career Honours

New Zealand Under-20

IRB Junior World Championship - 2010

Highlanders

Super Rugby - 2015

Panasonic Wild Knights

 Top League - 2015–16

Super Rugby statistics

References

1990 births
Living people
New Zealand rugby union players
Rugby union fly-halves
Rugby union players from Oamaru
Otago rugby union players
Highlanders (rugby union) players
Saitama Wild Knights players
New Zealand expatriate rugby union players
New Zealand expatriate sportspeople in Japan
Expatriate rugby union players in Japan
Sunwolves players
Kobelco Kobe Steelers players